Linköping Municipality (Linköpings kommun) is a municipality in Östergötland County in southern Sweden. With more than 165,000 inhabitants, it is the fifth largest municipality in Sweden.

The municipality is bordered in the west by Motala, and thence clockwise by Finspång, Norrköping, Söderköping, Åtvidaberg, Kinda, Boxholm and Mjölby municipalities.

The present municipality was formed in 1971 by the amalgamation of the City of Linköping with five surrounding rural municipalities. The number of original local government entities (as of 1863) making up Linköping Municipality is 32.

Linköping is one of the few municipalities in Sweden to style the speaker of the assembly as mayor.

Linköping wants to create a sustainable development of the city and therefore plan to become a carbon neutral community by 2025.

Politics

Municipal election 2018
On September 9, 2018, Linköping held Municipality Election:

In the aftermath of the 2014 municipality election,
The local Social Democrats (S; Social Demokraterna), Green Party (MP; Miljöpartiet)
and the Liberal People's Party (L; Liberalerna, formerly FP; Folk Partiet) formed a coalition majority named "coalition for Linköping" with 40 out of 79 seats,
while the minority opposition in Linköping consisted each separate by:
the Moderate Party (M ; Moderaterna), Centre Party (C; Center Partiet), Christian Democrats (Kristdemokraterna), Left Party (V; Vänsterpartiet)
and the Sweden Democrats (SD; Sverige Demokraterna).

After the 2018 elections,
all of the Alliance parties in the municipality joined together and took over 
from the Socialdemocrat's coalition rule and their mandat started the 1st January 2019 and onwards.

List of mayors 

Eva Joelsson Social Democrats (S), 1994–2006
Ann-Cathrine Hjerdt Moderate Party (M), 2006–2014	
Helena Balthammar Social Democrats (S), 2014–2018
Lars Vikinge Centre Party (C), 2018–present

Twin towns – sister cities

Linköping is twinned with:

 Ísafjarðarbær, Iceland
 Joensuu, Finland
 Kaunas, Lithuania
 Linz, Austria
 Macau, China
 Palo Alto, United States
 Tønsberg, Norway

Roskilde Municipality in Denmark chose in the summer of 2007 to cancel its sistership agreements with four Scandinavian local government entities, including Linköping Municipality. Twinning with Guangzhou in China terminated in February 2020.

References

External links